Omesheh (also Romanized as Omm-e Shah and Ommsheh; also known as Omshāsehveh and Umushe) is a village in Sangar Rural District, Sangar District, Rasht County, Gilan Province, Iran. At the 2006 census, its population was 795, in 227 families.

References 

Populated places in Rasht County